Sławomir Romanowski (born 25 April 1957) is a Polish sports shooter. He competed in the men's 50 metre free pistol event at the 1976 Summer Olympics.

References

1957 births
Living people
Polish male sport shooters
Olympic shooters of Poland
Shooters at the 1976 Summer Olympics
Shooters at the 1980 Summer Olympics
Sportspeople from Łódź
20th-century Polish people